Beauty and the Beast is an Australian panel television talk show that has appeared in numerous versions since the early days of Australian television.

The concept of the series is that viewers write in asking for advice about personal problems such as family squabbles, questions of social etiquette, marriage problems, contraception, work or career problems.

The host of the program - usually an intentionally brusque and outspoken older male - the so-called "Beast" of the title presents each viewer question in turn and a panel of female celebrities  AKA "the Beauties" serve as panellists who provide their advice on the problem and solutions, the panel then discuss the problem and the advice given offering opinions and views.

History 

The first version of the show began on the Seven Network in 1964, hosted by Eric Baume as the "Beast". Baume was later replaced by presenters including Stuart Wagstaff (1966-1968), Noel Ferrier (1969), John Laws (1970), and Rex Mossop (1971-1973).

The format was revived in 1982, with two rival versions, both carrying the same title, appearing on different networks. Network Ten's version had John Laws back as host, later replaced by Clive Robertson, whilst the Seven Network version was hosted by Derryn Hinch.

A 1990s version of the program ran on both Network Ten and Foxtel, hosted by radio broadcaster Stan Zemanek (1996-2001) and radio broadcaster Doug Mulray (2002). Network Ten along with FX aired the final episode in 2002.

The series returned on W exclusively in 2005 after a 3-year hiatus, with Stan Zemanek returning as host. Beauty and the Beast aired its final episode on W in early July 2007, with Zemanek passing away that same month. Since then the program has not returned to air.

Notable "Beauties"

Original cast
The original "Beauties" included Maggie Tabberer, Dita Cobb, Ena Harwood (mother of Andrew Harwood), Patricia Firman, Patricia Lovell, Hazel Phillips, Noeline Brown and Freda Lesslie.

Notable celebrity panellists
Other notable panelists on the latter versions included

New Zealand version

The Beauty and the Beast format was adopted by Television New Zealand as an afternoon television series. It was filmed in the Dunedin studios from 1976 to 1985. The show was directed by Lorraine Isaacs, and featured  Selwyn Toogood as the host with a four-woman panel. Notable panelists included Shona McFarlane, Catherine Tizard (later Governor-General), and Johnny Frisbie. The show occasionally featured male panelists such as art-dealer Trevor Plumbly.

A show with a similar concept called How's Life? aired in the early 2000s in New Zealand hosted by Charlotte Dawson.

See also
Leave it to the Girls – 1957 series with similar format, and which also occasionally featured Eric Baume.
Outnumbered – American series with similar format

References

External links
 
 

Australian television talk shows
Seven Network original programming
Network 10 original programming
1964 Australian television series debuts
1973 Australian television series endings
1982 Australian television series debuts
1983 Australian television series endings
1996 Australian television series debuts
2002 Australian television series endings
2005 Australian television series debuts
2007 Australian television series endings
1960s Australian television series
1980s Australian television series
1990s Australian television series
2000s Australian television series
New Zealand television talk shows
TVNZ original programming
Black-and-white Australian television shows
English-language television shows